Marco Milanese (27 October 1958 ) is an Italian archeologist. He graduated in archeology in 1981 from the University of Genoa. In 1983 he won the 3rd edition of the Bretschneider's Erma International Archeology Prize in Rome, with the work Scavi nell'oppidum pre-romano di Genova.
In 1987 he obtained his PhD in archeology at the University of Pisa, Siena and Florence. Since 1992 he has been teaching, as associate professor, in archaeological research methodologies and medieval archeology at the Universities of Sassari, Genoa, Arezzo and Pisa. Since 2003 he has been full professor in Sassari.

Publications 

 with Giovanni Aliprandi, La Ceramica Europea Introduzione alla tecnologia alla storia e all'arte, Editore: ECIG Edizioni culturali internazionali Genova, (1986)  
with Riccardo Francovich, Lo Scavo archeologico di Montarrenti e i problemi dell'incastellamento medievale. Esperienze a confronto, Firenze 
Genova romana. Mercato e città dalla tarda età repubblicana a Diocleziano dagli scavi del colle di Castello (Genova-San Silvestro), Ed. L'Erma di Bretschneider, Roma, 1993  
Studi e ricerche sul villaggio medievale di Geridu. Miscellanea 1996-2001, QUAVAS - Quaderni del Centro di Documentazione dei Villaggi Abbandonati della Sardegna, 2004 
 Alghero. Archeologia di una città medievale, Sassari. 2013

References

External links
 

People from Genoa
Italian archaeologists
1958 births
Living people
Medieval archaeologists